Hi5teria is a 2012 omnibus Indonesian horror-thriller film by Starvision Plus & UPI Productions. The film was directed by Adrianto Dewo, Chairun Nissa, Billy Christian, Nicholas Yudifar and Harvan Agustriansyah; and also was screenplay by Daud Sumolang, Chairun Nissa, Billy Christian, Sungkono Pastra and Harvan Agustriansyah. This film have 5 plot stories and was released on March 29, 2012.

The film had premiered at the Bucheon International Fantastic Film Festival in South Korea.<ref>{{cite web|url=http://m.tempo.co/read/news/2012/06/27/111413363/Hi5teria-Diputar-di-Festival-Film-Puchon|title=Hi5teria has played in the Bucheon Film Festival|author=Dian Yuliastuti|publisher=Tempo|date=June 27, 2012}}</ref> At the 2012 Maya Awards, Hi5teria subsequently nominated for category Best Omnibus Film.

 Plot Hi5teria'' is a 5 thriller omnibus produced by Starvision & Upi Production, and directed by 5 young promising director. This project became from Upi Avianto to make an omnibus thriller from true story-tale in Indonesia.

Pasar Setan (Satan's Market)
 Directed by : Adrianto Dewo
 Screenplay by : Daud Sumolang

Sari (Tara Basro) enlists the help of a hiker to find her husband (Egi Fedly), missing for three days in the jungle. But as they search, they seem to be stuck going in circles and, as night falls, the jungle becomes full of weird noises and mysterious sights. The hiker awakes one morning to find that Sari has disappeared. Where has she gone and what mystery lies hidden in the jungle?

Wayang Kulit (Shadow Puppet)
 Directed & Screenplay by : Chairun Nissa

An American female journalist (Maya Otos) is researching about an all female Wayang Kulit show. Her research causes her to experience mystical events, unknowingly becoming trapped.

Kotak Musik (Music Box)
 Directed & Screenplay by : Billy Christian

Farah (Luna Maya) is a young scientist who does not believe in ghosts and other mystical stories, knowing there is a scientific explanation for everything that happens. But after researching an old house, Farah is haunted by strange occurrences and a small child who asks her to play. Who is the child and why does he keep asking Farah to play?

Palasik
 Directed by : Nicholas Yudifar
 Screenplay by : Sungkono Pastra

A father (Tumpal Tampubolon), mother (Imelda Therinne), and their teenage child (Poppy Sovia) vacation at a small town villa in Bogor, Indonesia. Their holiday transforms into a nightmare when they're terrorized by a headless ghost, connected with the black magic of Palasik.

Loket (Basement)
 Directed & Screenplay by: Harvan Agustriansyah

On a dark quiet night, a ticket seller (Icha Nuraini) at a mall is surprised as somebody knocks on her window. The ticket seller is brought to the parking lot and witnesses a sadistic murder, which may be connected to her.

Cast

Pasar Setan cast 
 Tara Basro as Sari, the main protagonist in segment film
 Dion Wiyoko as Zul
 Egi Fedly as Jaka, Sari' husband

Wayang Koelit cast 
 Sigi Wimala as Muni, a Sinden
 Maya Otos as Nicola, an American reporter
 Toto Rasiti as Oding, a Javanese arts guide

Kotak Musik cast 
 Luna Maya as Farah
 Kriss Hatta as Teddy
 Dinda Kanya Dewi as Farah' sister
 Khiva Iskak as Security
 Jennye Awuy as Little Girl Ghost

Palasik cast
 Poppy Sovia as step-daughter
 Imelda Therinne as Vita, an pregnant woman
 Tumpal Tampubolon as father

Loket cast 
 Bella Esperances as mysterious woman
 Ichi Nuraini as a ticket seller

References

External links 
 

2012 films
2010s Indonesian-language films
2012 horror films
Indonesian horror films